San Ignacio is a town in Mamoré Province in the Beni Department of northern Bolivia.

References

External links
Satellite map at Maplandia.com

Populated places in Beni Department